WPQP (93.1 FM, "Pop 93.1-95.9") is a radio station licensed to Clearfield, Pennsylvania. Owned by Seven Mountains Media, it broadcasts a hot adult contemporary format. The station is also simulcast by WQQP 95.9 in Sykesville, Pennsylvania.

History 
Throughout the 1980s, WQYX was an affiliate of Rick Dees Weekly Top 40 and Retro Pop Reunion.

In October 2016, First Media reached a deal to sell its remaining stations in West Central Pennsylvania to Seven Mountains Media for $4.5 million. At this point, WQYX was broadcasting a hot adult contemporary format branded as 93.1 WQYX In August 2017, the station changed its call letters to WPQP, and announced that it would flip to contemporary hit radio as Pop 93.1 on August 29.

On March 19, 2018, sister station WZDB switched from rock to a simulcast of WPQP, changing its call sign to WQQP on March 23, 2018.

References

External links

PQP
Hot adult contemporary radio stations in the United States